On 25 December 2012, an Antonov An-72 military transport aircraft operated by the Kazakh Armed Forces crashed about  from the city of Shymkent, Kazakhstan, where the aircraft was preparing to land. All 27 people on board died in the crash.

History of the flight 
The aircraft had been flying from Kazakhstan's capital of Astana to Shymkent, and was carrying seven crew and 20 members of the Kazakh border patrol, including its leader, the acting director of the Kazakhstan Border Guard Service, Colonel Turganbek Stambekov.

Accident 
The accident occurred at about 19:00 local time (1300 UTC) as the aircraft was descending to land. Emergency crews were dispatched from Shymkent in response. However, the head of the local emergency services department stated, "the plane was destroyed by fire. Only fragments [were] left." Kazakhstan's National Security Committee issued a statement confirming that all 27 people on board had died in the crash, and also said that an investigation into the incident has begun.

Investigation 
The investigation commission found out that failure of the autopilot and radio altimeter combined with poor visibility, and the pilot failing to follow instruction to use the barometric altimeter caused the crash.

References 

2012 disasters in Kazakhstan
Aviation accidents and incidents in 2012
Aviation accidents and incidents in Kazakhstan
Turkistan Region
December 2012 events in Asia